Torpaid mac Taicthech (died 913) was an Irish poet.

Torpaid held the post of Chief Ollam of Ireland.

The Genealogies from Rawlinson B 502 state he belonged to the Uí Daigre - “¶1638] Torpaid m. Taicthich m. Échtgusa m. Cáechthuile m. Aimre m. Doaltair m. Fínáin m. Áedloga m. Doborgin m. Finnchon m. Maellrach m. Fáeláin m. Dorbo m. Fáelgine m. Conath m. Luigdech m. Daigri.”

His obit is given in the Annals of Inisfallen as follows- “AI913.2 Repose of Torpaid son of Taicthech, chief poet of Ireland.”

External links
http://www.ucc.ie/celt/published/T100005B/index.html

Medieval Irish poets
913 deaths
9th-century Irish writers
10th-century Irish writers
Year of birth unknown
Irish male poets